Edward James Keas (January 2, 1863 – January 12, 1940) was an American pitcher in Major League Baseball. He played for the 1888 Cleveland Blues of the American Association.

External links

1863 births
1940 deaths
19th-century baseball players
Major League Baseball pitchers
Cleveland Blues (1887–88) players
Kansas City Cowboys (minor league) players
Milwaukee Brewers (minor league) players
Milwaukee Creams players
Ottawa Modocs players
Baseball players from Iowa
Sportspeople from Dubuque, Iowa